Defending champion Andy Murray defeated David Ferrer in the final, 7–5, 6–4 to win the singles tennis title at the 2011 Shanghai Masters.

Seeds
The top eight seeds receive a bye into the second round.

Draw

Finals

Top half

Section 1

Section 2

Bottom half

Section 3

Section 4

Qualifying rounds

Seeds

Qualifiers

Qualifying draw

First qualifier

Second qualifier

Third qualifier

Fourth qualifier

Fifth qualifier

Sixth qualifier

Seventh qualifier

References
 Main Draw
 Qualifying Draw

Shanghai Rolex Masters - Singles
2011 Shanghai Rolex Masters